This article seeks to list all the trains that ply between two cities in India. The trains listed in the set of cities must be the originating & terminating cities respectively.

Only Cities with more than one train between them to be listed.

Ahmedabad–Chennai 

 12655/56 Navjeevan Express
 22919/20 Chennai–Ahmedabad Humsafar Express
 19419/19 Chennai Central–Ahmedabad Express(Chennai Express)
 20953/54 Ahmedabad–Chennai Central express

Ahmedabad–Kolkata 

 12833/34 Howrah–Ahmedabad Superfast Express
 19414/14 Ahmedabad–Kolkata Express(Sare Jahan Se Achchha Express)

Ahmedabad–Darbhanga 

 19165/66 Ahmedabad–Darbhanga Sabarmati Express
 15559/60 Darbhanga–Ahmedabad Antyodaya Express
 09465/66 Ahmedabad–Darbhanga Clone Special

Ahmedabad–Agra 

 12547/12548 Agra Cantt–Sabarmati BG Superfast Express
 04165/66 Agra Cantt – Ahmedabad SF Special Fare
 04167/68 Agra Cantt – Ahmedabad SF Special Fare

Ahmedabad–Jodhpur 

 14819/20  BGKT–Sabarmati Intercity Express
 14803/04 Bhagat Ki Kothi–Ahmedabad Weekly Express
 14821/22  Sabarmati–Jodhpur Express

Ahmedabad–Kevadia 

 20947/20948 Ekta Nagar–Ahmedabad Jan Shatabdi Express
 20949/20950 Ekta Nagar–Ahmedabad Jan Shatabdi Express

Ahmedabad–Patna 

 12947/48 Azimabad Express
 19421/22 Ahmedabad–Patna Weekly Express
 09447/48 Ahmedabad-Patna Clone Special

Ahmedabad–Pune 

 11095/96 Ahimsa Express
 12297/98 Ahmedabad–Pune Duronto Express
 22185/86 Ahmedabad–Pune SF Express

Ahmedabad–Puri 

 12843/44 Puri–Ahmedabad Express
 18405/06 Puri–Ahmedabad Weekly Express
 20861/62 Ahmedabad–Puri Express

Ahmedabad–Vadodara 

 19035/36 Vadodara–Ahmedabad Intercity Express
 09495/96 Sankalp Fast Passenger

Ahmedabad–Varanasi 

 19167/68 Sabarmati Express
 19407/08 Ahmedabad–Varanasi Weekly Express

Chennai–Nagercoil 

 12667/12668 Chennai Egmore–Nagercoil Weekly Superfast Express
 12689/12690 Chennai Central–Nagercoil Weekly Superfast Express
 16191/16192 Tambaram–Nagercoil Antyodaya Express

 22657/22658 Tambaram–Nagercoil Superfast Express

Chennai–Tiruchirappalli 

 12653/12654 Rockfort Superfast Express
 16795/16796 Cholan Superfast Express
 12605/12606 Pallavan Superfast Express

Mysuru–Bengaluru

12613/12614 – Tippu Express
16023/16024 – Malgudi Express
16215/16216 – Chamundi Express
16557/16558 – Mysore–Bangalore Rajya Rani Express

Mysuru–Chennai

 12007/12008 Chennai Central–Mysuru Shatabdi Express
 12609/12610 Mysuru–Chennai Express
16021/16022 Kaveri Express
 22681/22682 Chennai–Mysuru Weekly Superfast Express.
20607/20608 MGR Chennai Central - Mysuru Vande Bharat Express

Bengaluru–Chennai

12027/12028 – Chennai Central–Bengaluru City Shatabdi Express
12291/12292 –  Yesvantpur–Chennai Central Superfast Express
12607/12608 – Lal Bagh Express
12639/12640 – Brindavan Express
12657/12658 – Chennai–Bangalore Mail
22625/22626 – Chennai–Bangalore Double Decker Express
20607/20608 Mysuru-Chennai Central Vande Bharat Express

Bengaluru–Hyderabad 

 12735/36 Secunderabad–Yesvantpur Garib Rath Express
 12785/86 Kacheguda–Mysuru Express
 16569/70 Yasvantpur–Kacheguda Express
 17603/04 Prashanti Nilayam Express

Mumbai–Ahmedabad

 12009/10 Mumbai Central–Ahmedabad Shatabdi Express
 12901/02 Gujarat Mail
 12931/32 Mumbai Central–Ahmedabad Double Decker Express
 12933/34 Karnavati Express
 19011/12 Gujarat Superfast Express
 22927/28 Lok Shakti Express
 59439/40 Mumbai Central–Ahmedabad Passenger
 82901/02 Ahmedabad – Mumbai Central Tejas Express

Mumbai–Pune 

 Via Kalyan
 11007/08 Deccan Express
 11009/10 Sinhagad Express
 12123/24 Deccan Queen
 12127/28 Mumbai–Pune Intercity Express
 22105/06 Indrayani Express

 Via Panvel
 12125/26 Pragati Express

Mumbai–Nagpur 

 Via Badnera, Bhusaval
 12139/40 Sewagram Express
 12289/90 Nagpur Duronto Express

 Via , Nanded,  
 11401/02 Nandigram Express
 Via Akola, 
 11202/01 Lokmanya Tilak Terminus–Ajni Express

Mumbai–Kolhapur 

 11023/24 Sahyadri Express
 11029/30 Koyna Express
 17411/12 Mahalaxmi Express

Mumbai–Nanded 

 Via Manmad
 17617/18 Tapovan Express
 11011/12 LTT Kurla–Nanded Express
 17611/12 Nanded–Mumbai CST Rajya Rani Express
 Via 
 17613/14 Panvel–Hazur Sahib Nanded Express

Mumbai–Kolkata 

 12101/02 Jnaneswari Express
 12151/52 Samarsata Express
 12261/62 Mumbai CST–Howrah Duronto Express
 12321/22 Kolkata Mail
 12809/10 Howrah Mumbai Mail
 12859/60 Gitanjali Express
 12869/70 Howrah–Mumbai Superfast Express
 18029/30 Shalimar–Lokmanya Tilak Terminus Express

Mumbai–Surat

 12921/22 Flying Ranee
 12935/36 Surat–Bandra Terminus Intercity Superfast Express

Mumbai–Jamnagar 
 12267/12268 Mumbai Central–Hapa Duronto Express
 22923/22924 Bandra Terminus–Jamnagar Humsafar Express

Mumbai–Delhi 

 09003/04 Bandra Terminus–Hazrat Nizamuddin Rajdhani Special
 12215/16 Delhi Sarai Rohilla–Bandra Terminus Garib Rath Express
 12247/48 Bandra Terminus–Hazrat Nizamuddin Yuva Express
 12907/08 Maharashtra Sampark Kranti Express
 12909/10 Bandra Terminus–Hazrat Nizamuddin Garib Rath Express
 12951/52 Mumbai Rajdhani Express
 12953/54 August Kranti Rajdhani Express
 22109/10 Lokmanya Tilak Terminus–Hazrat Nizamuddin AC Express
 22209/10 Mumbai–New Delhi Duronto Express
 22221/22 CSMT Mumbai–Hazrat Nizamuddin Delhi Rajdhani Express
 22913/14 Mumbai Central–New Delhi AC Suvidha Special Express
 22949/50 Bandra Terminus–Delhi Sarai Rohilla Express

Mumbai–Bhavnagar 

 12971/72 Bandra Terminus–Bhavnagar Terminus Express
 22963/64 Bandra Terminus–Bhavnagar Terminus Weekly Superfast Express

Mumbai–Bhuj 

 12959/60 Dadar–Bhuj Superfast Express
 19115/16 Sayajinagari Express
 22903/04 Bandra Terminus–Bhuj AC Superfast Express
 22955/56 Kutch Express

Mumbai–Amritsar 

 11057/58 Mumbai CST–Amritsar Express
 12903/04 Golden Temple Mail
 12925/26 Paschim Express

Mumbai–Ajmer 

 12989/90 Dadar–Ajmer Superfast Express
 22995/96 Ajmer–Bandra Terminus Express

Mumbai–Bikaner 

 12489/90 Bikaner–Dadar Superfast Express
 14707/08 Ranakpur Express
 22473/74 Bikaner–Bandra Terminus Superfast Express

Mumbai–Allahabad 

 11069/70 Tulsi Express
 12293/94 Lokmanya Tilak Terminus–Allahabad Duronto Express

Mumbai–Hyderabad 

 12219/20 Lokmanya Tilak Terminus–Secunderabad AC Duronto Express
 12701/02 Hussainsagar Express
 17031/32 Hyderabad–Mumbai Express
 17057/58 Devagiri Express

Mumbai–Chennai 

 22157/58 Mumbai–Chennai Mail
 22159/60 Mumbai CST–Chennai Express
 22179/80 Lokmanya Tilak Terminus–Chennai Central Weekly Express
 12163/64 Dadar–Chennai Egmore Express

Mumbai–Lucknow 

 12107/08 Lokmanya Tilak Terminus–Lucknow Junction Superfast Express
 12533/34 Pushpak Express
 19021/22 Bandra Terminus–Lucknow Weekly Express
 22121/22 Lokmanya Tilak Terminus–Lucknow AC SF Express

Mumbai–Patna 

 12141/42 Lokmanya Tilak Terminus–Patliputra Express
 13201/02 Rajendra Nagar–Lokmanya Tilak Terminus Janta Express
 22971/72 Bandra Terminus–Patna Weekly Express
 82355/56 Patna–Mumbai CSMT Suvidha Superfast Express

Mumbai–Indore 

 12227/28 Mumbai Central–Indore Duronto Express
 12961/62 Avantika Express

Mumbai–Bhubaneshwar 

 11019/20 Konark Express
 12879/80 Lokmanya Tilak Terminus–Bhubaneswar Superfast Express

Mumbai–Goa 

 10103/04 Mandovi Express
 10111/12 Konkan Kanya Express
 11085/86,11099/11100 Lokmanya Tilak Terminus–Madgaon AC Double Decker Express
 12051/52 Dadar–Madgaon Jan Shatabdi Express
 22115/16 Lokmanya Tilak Terminus–Karmali AC Superfast Express
 22119/20 Mumbai CSMT–Karmali Tejas Express

Mumbai–Manmad 

 12109/10 Panchvati Express
 12117/18 Godavari Superfast Express

Mumbai–Mahuva 

 22989/90 Bandra Terminus–Mahuva Express
 22993/94 Bandra Terminus–Mahuva Superfast Express

Mumbai–Valsad 

 59023/24 Mumbai Central–Valsad Fast Passenger
 59046 Valsad–Bandra Terminus Passenger

Mumbai–Visakhapatnam 

 18519/20 Visakhapatnam–Lokmanya Tilak Terminus Express
 22847/48 Visakhapatnam–Lokmanya Tilak Terminus Superfast Express

Mumbai–Thiruvananthapuram 

 12201/02 Kochuveli–Lokmanya Tilak Terminus Garib Rath Express
 16331/32 Mumbai CSMT–Thiruvananthapuram Weekly Express
 16345/46 Netravati Express
 22113/14 Lokmanya Tilak Terminus–Kochuveli Express

Delhi–Ahmedabad 

 12915/16 Ashram Express
 12917/18 Gujarat Sampark Kranti Express
 12957/58 Swarna Jayanti Rajdhani Express

Delhi–Chennai 

 12269/70 Chennai–Hazrat Nizamuddin Duronto Express
 12433/34 Chennai Rajdhani Express
 12611/12 Chennai Central–Hazrat Nizamuddin Garib Rath Express
12621/22 Tamil Nadu Express
12615/16 Grand Trunk Express

Delhi–Bengaluru 

 12213/14 Yeshvantapur–Delhi Sarai Rohilla AC Duronto Express
 12627/28 Karnataka Express
 12629/30/49/50 Karnataka Sampark Kranti Express
 22691/92 Bangalore Rajdhani Express

Delhi–Hyderabad 

 12285/86 Secunderabad–Hazrat Nizamuddin Duronto Express
 12437/38 Secunderabad Rajdhani Express
 12721/22 Dakshin Express
 12723/24 Telangana Express

Delhi–Thiruvananthapuram 

 12431/32 Thiruvananthapuram Rajdhani Express
 12625/26 Kerala Express
 12643/44 Thiruvananthapuram Swarna Jayanti Express
 22633/34 Thiruvananthapuram–Hazrat Nizamuddin Express
 22653/54 Thiruvananthapuram–Hazrat Nizamuddin Express (via Kottayam)
 22655/56 Thiruvananthapuram–Hazrat Nizamuddin Express (via Alappuzha)

Delhi–Kochi 

 12283/84 Ernakulam–H.Nizamuddin Duronto Express
 12617/18 Mangala Lakshadweep Express
 12645/46 Millennium Express

Delhi–Kolkata 

 12249/50 Howrah–Delhi Yuva Express
 12259/60 Sealdah–New Delhi Duronto Express
 12273/74 Howrah–New Delhi Duronto Express
 12301/02/05/06 Howrah Rajdhani Express
 12303/04/81/82 Poorva Express
 12313/14 Sealdah Rajdhani Express
 12323/24 Howrah–Anand Vihar Superfast Express
 12329/30 West Bengal Sampark Kranti Express
 13039/40 Howrah–Delhi Janata Express
 13111/12 Lal Quila Express
 13119/20 Sealdah–Anand Vihar Express
 22857/58 Santragachi–Anand Vihar Superfast Express

Delhi–Dehradun 

 12017/18 Dehradun Shatabdi Express
 12055/56 Dehradun Jan Shatabdi Express
 12205/06 Nanda Devi AC Express
 14041/42 Mussoorie Express

Delhi–Amritsar 

 12013/14 Amritsar Shatabdi Express
 12029/30 New Delhi–Amritsar Swarna Shatabdi Express
 12031/32 New Delhi–Amritsar Shatabdi Express
 12459/60 New Delhi–Amritsar Intercity Express
 12497/98 Shan-e-Punjab Express

Delhi–Katra 

 12445/46 Uttar Sampark Kranti Express
 14033/34 Jammu Mail
 22461/62 Shri Shakti AC Express

Delhi–Ajmer 

 12015/16 New Delhi–Daurai Shatabdi Express
 12065/66 Ajmer–Delhi Sarai Rohilla Jan Shatabdi Express

Delhi–Kanpur 

 12033/34 Kanpur–New Delhi Shatabdi Express
 12451/52 Shram Shakti Express
 14151/52 Kanpur Central–Anand Vihar Terminal Express

Delhi–Allahabad 

 12275/76 Allahabad–New Delhi Humsafar Express
 12417/18 Prayagraj Express
 22437/38 Allahabad–Anand Vihar Terminal Humsafar Express

Delhi–Kalka 

 12005/06 New Delhi–Kalka Shatabdi Express 
 12011/12 Kalka Shatabdi Express
 14095/96 Himalayan Queen Express

Delhi–Lucknow 

 12003/04 Lucknow Swarna Shatabdi Express
 12229/30 Lucknow Mail
 12419/20 Gomti Express
 12429/30 Lucknow–New Delhi AC Superfast Express
 12583/84 Lucknow Junction–Anand Vihar Terminal Double Decker Express

Surat–Chhapra 
 19045/46 Tapti Ganga Express
 09065/66 Surat–Chhapra Clone Special

Surat–Jamnagar 

 22959/60 Surat–Jamnagar Intercity Superfast Express
 22961/62 Surat–Hapa Intercity Weekly Superfast Express

Indore–Nagpur 

 12913/14 Indore–Nagpur Tri Shatabdi Express
 12923/94 Dr. Ambedkar Nagar–Nagpur Superfast Express

Lucknow–Varanasi 

 14203/04 Varanasi–Lucknow Intercity Express
 14219/20 Varanasi–Lucknow Intercity Express (via Pratapgarh)
 14227/28 Varanasi–Lucknow Charbagh Varuna Express
 15007/08 Krishak Express

Kolkata–Dhanbad 

 12339/40 Coalfield Express
 22387/88 Black Diamond Express
 12385/86 Howrah–Dhanbad Double Decker Express

Kolkata–Asansol 

 12341/42 Agniveena Express
 12383/84 Sealdah–Asansol Intercity Express

Kolkata–Rampurhat 

 13187/88 Maa Tara Express
 53047/48 Viswabharati Fast Passenger

Kolkata–New Jalpaiguri 

 12041/42 New Jalpaiguri–Howrah Shatabdi Express
 12343/44 Darjeeling Mail
 22309/10 Howrah–New Jalpaiguri AC Express

Kolkata–Porbandar 

 12905/06 Shalimar–Porbandar Superfast Express
 12949/50 Porbandar–Santragachi Kavi Guru Express

Kolkata–Puri 

 12277/78 Howrah–Puri Shatabdi Express
 12821/22 Dhauli Express
 12837/38 Howrah–Puri Express
 12881/82 Puri–Howrah Garib Rath Express
 12887/88 Puri–Howrah Express
 18409/10 Sri Jagannath Express
 22201/02 Sealdah–Puri Duronto Express
 22835/36 Shalimar–Puri Express

Kolkata–Patna 

 12023/24 Howrah–Patna Jan Shatabdi Express
 12351/52 Howrah–Rajendra Nagar Express
 12359/60 Kolkata–Patna Garib Rath Express
 13131/32 Kolkata–Patna Express
 22213/14 Kolkata Shalimar–Patna Duronto Express

Kolkata–Chennai 

 12839/40 Howrah–Chennai Mail
 12841/42 Coromandel Express
 22807/08 Santragachi–Chennai Central AC Express
 22825/26 Shalimar–Chennai Central Weekly Superfast Express
 22841/42 Santragachi–Chennai Central Antyodaya Express

Kolkata–Bengaluru 

 12245/46 Howrah–Yeshvantapur Duronto Express
 12863/64 Howrah–Yesvantpur Superfast Express
 22863/64 Howrah–Yesvantpur AC Superfast Express
 22887/88 Howrah–Yesvantpur Humsafar Express

Kolkata–Hyderabad 

 12703/04 Falaknuma Express
 12773/74 Shalimar–Secunderabad AC Superfast Express
 18645/46 East Coast Express
 22849/50 Shalimar Secunderabad Express

Pune–Delhi 

 12263/64 Hazrat Nizamuddin–Pune Duronto Express
 12493/94 Darshan AC Express

Pune–Kolkata 

 12129/30 Azad Hind Express
 12221/22 Pune–Howrah Duronto Express
 20821/22 Pune–Santragachi Humsafar Express

Pune–Hyderabad 

 11025/26 Pune–Secunderabad Shatabdi Express
 17013/14 Hyderabad–Pune Express

Pune–Kochi 

 11097/98 Poorna Express
 22149/50 Pune–Ernakulam Express

Pune–Nagpur 

 12113/14 Pune–Nagpur Garib Rath Express
 12135/36 Pune–Nagpur Express
 22123/24 Pune–Ajni AC Superfast Express
 22139/40 Pune–Ajni Humsafar Express
 11419/20 Pune–Nagpur Humsafar Express

Pune–Amravati (Maharashtra) 

 11405/06 Pune–Amravati Express
 22117/18 Pune–Amravati AC Superfast Express

Pune–Solapur 

 12157/58 Hutatma Express
 12169/70 Pune–Solapur Intercity Express

Guwahati–Jammu Tawi 

 15651/52 Lohit Express
 15653/54 Amarnath Express

Chennai–Coimbatore

 12243/44 Chennai Central–Coimbatore Shatabdi Express

 12673/74 Cheran Superfast Express
 12675/76 Kovai Express
 12679/80 Chennai Central–Coimbatore Intercity Express
 12681/82 Coimbatore–Chennai Central Superfast Express

Chennai–Hyderabad 
 12603/12604 Chennai–Hyderabad Superfast Express
 12759/12760 Charminar Express
 17651/17652 Kacheguda–Chengalpattu Express

Chennai–Madurai

 12635/12636 Vaigai Superfast Express
 12637/12638 Pandian Superfast Express
 20601/20602 Chennai Central–Madurai Weekly AC Superfast Express
 22205/22206 Chennai–Madurai AC Duronto Express
 22623/22624 Mahal Express
 22671/22672 Chennai Egmore–Madurai Tejas Express

Guwahati–Delhi

 12501/12502 Poorvottar Sampark Kranti Express
 12505/12506 North East Express

Guwahati–Kolkata

 12345/12346  Saraighat Express
 12517/12518  Kolkata–Guwahati Garib Rath Express

Guwahati–Mumbai 

 12519/12520 Lokmanya Tilak Terminus–Kamakhya AC Express
 15645/15646 Lokmanya Tilak Terminus–Guwahati Express (via Katihar)
 15647/15648 Lokmanya Tilak Terminus–Guwahati Express (via Malda Town)
 22511/22512 Lokmanya Tilak Terminus–Kamakhya Karmabhoomi Express

Guwahati–Bangalore

 12509/12510 Kaziranga Superfast Express
 12551/12552 Yesvantpur–Kamakhya AC Superfast Express

Visakhapatnam–Delhi

 12803/04 Visakhapatnam Swarna Jayanti Express
 12807/08 Samata Express
 22415/16 Andhra Pradesh Express

Visakhapatnam–Hyderabad

 12727/28 Godavari Express
 12739/40 Visakhapatnam–Secunderabad Garib Rath Express
 12783/84 Secunderabad–Visakhapatnam AC Express
 12805/06 Janmabhoomi Express
 22203/04 Visakhapatnam–Secunderabad Duronto Express

Visakhapatnam-Tirupati
 17487/88 Tirumala Express
 22707/08 Visakhapatnam-Tirupati Double Decker Express

Hyderabad–Tirupati
 12734/35 Narayanadri Express
 12763/64 Padmavati Express
 12769/70 Seven Hills Express
 12797/98 Secunderabad–Tirupati Express

Hyderabad–Vijayawada
 12713/14 Satavahana Express
 12795/96 Secunderabad–Vijayawada Intercity Express

Hyderabad–Guntur
 17201/02 Golconda Express
 12705/06 Guntur–Secunderabad Intercity Express
 12747/48 Palnadu Express

Hyderabad–Kurnool
 17023/24 Tungabhadra Express
 17027/28 Hundry Express

Vijayawada–Chennai

 12077/78 Chennai Central–Vijayawada Jan Shatabdi Express
 12711/12 Pinakini Express

Chennai - Rameswaran

 22661/22662 Sethu Superfast Express
 16851/16852  Boat Mail Express

$